Horatio Townshend, 1st Baron Townsend and 1st Viscount Townshend (14 December 1630 – 10 December 1687), known as Sir Horatio Townshend, 3rd baronet, of Raynham, from 1648 to 1661, was an English politician who sat in the House of Commons between 1656 and 1660 and was raised to the peerage in 1661.

Early life
Townshend was the younger son of Sir Roger Townshend, 1st Baronet, of Raynham, and his wife Mary Vere, daughter of Horace Vere, 1st Baron Vere of Tilbury. He was a student at St John's College, Cambridge, in 1644 and travelled abroad in Italy and Switzerland from 1646 to 1648. In 1648 he succeeded his elder brother in the baronetcy.

Political career
He was elected member of parliament for Norfolk in 1656 for the Second Protectorate Parliament and in 1659 for the Third Protectorate Parliament.

Townshend was elected MP for Norfolk again in 1660 for the Convention Parliament. He was a supporter of King Charles II and played an important role in the restoration of the monarchy in 1660. In 1661 he was raised to the peerage as Baron Townshend, of Lynn Regis in the County of Norfolk, and was Lord Lieutenant of Norfolk between 1660 and 1676. In 1682 he was further honoured when he was made Viscount Townshend, of Raynham in the County of Norfolk.

Marriage and family
Townshend married Mary Ashe, daughter of a fellow Member of Parliament, Sir Joseph Ashe. Lord Townshend died in December 1687, aged 56, and was succeeded in his titles by his son Charles, who became a prominent statesman. Other descendants of Townshend include George Townshend, 1st Marquess Townshend, Charles Townshend and Thomas Townshend, 1st Viscount Sydney.

Notes

References 
Kidd, Charles, Williamson, David (editors). Debrett's Peerage and Baronetage (1990 edition). New York: St Martin's Press, 1990, 

|-

|-

|-

1630 births
1687 deaths
17th-century English nobility
Lord-Lieutenants of Norfolk
Alumni of St John's College, Cambridge
Horatio Townshend
Townshend, Horatio
Townshend, Horatio
Townshend, Horatio
1
People from Raynham, Norfolk
Townshend, Horatio
Peers of England created by Charles II